New Zealand Natural Premium Ice Cream is a global franchise network based in Auckland, New Zealand. It operates as an international franchisor of ice cream, frozen yoghurt, smoothie and juice parlours and mini-parlours, which can be found in shopping centres in Australia, New Zealand, Thailand and other countries. The ice cream is also available at supermarkets throughout New Zealand and Australia.

Company history
New Zealand Natural began as a small ice creamery in Christchurch, New Zealand in 1984 that specialized in ice cream with no artificial colours or flavours. Then by chance, Rael Polivnick, who founded the company, met the owner on a flight crossing the Tasman Sea. Polivnick, seeing the potential, purchased the rights to open a New Zealand Natural store at Bondi Beach in Sydney in 1985.

Recognition
New Zealand Natural has won the Export Award at the Westpac New Zealand Franchise Awards and the SIAL D'Or Award in France.

The company's Gold Pure Vanilla was named best in Category at the 14th New Zealand Ice Cream Awards in 2010.

References

External links
 

Ice cream parlors
Dairy products companies of New Zealand
Regional restaurant chains
Ice cream brands
1984 establishments in New Zealand